Idar Kristiansen (1932, Honningsvåg – 1985) is a Norwegian poet, novelist, short story writer and non-fiction writer. He made his literary debut in 1957 with the poetry collection Sanger fra en tundra. His main work is a tetralogy on the Finnish immigration to Finnmark, Kornet og fiskene (1978-1981).

He was awarded the Aschehoug Prize in 1980.

References

1932 births
1985 deaths
People from Nordkapp
20th-century Norwegian poets
Norwegian male poets
Norwegian non-fiction writers
20th-century Norwegian novelists
Norwegian male novelists
20th-century Norwegian male writers
20th-century non-fiction writers
Male non-fiction writers